Mezimbite Forest Center is a conservation project in Mozambique which aims to eliminates poverty in forest communities by providing the highest valued jobs that protect and restore the forests of Africa.

It was founded by Allan Schwarz, formerly of the Massachusetts Institute of Technology, in 1994 to produce crafts from Mozambican hardwoods, and to plant trees to replace those used.

References

Nature conservation in Mozambique
Conservation projects